Hello World (stylized _hello world) is an album by American synthpop/freestyle band Information Society. It is a return to the band's "classic" 1980s lineup.

Track listing
 Land of the Blind - 3:49
 The Prize - 4:00
 Where Were You? - 3:51
 Get Back - 4:09
 Jonestown - 3:30
 Dancing With Strangers - 4:35
 Beautiful World (featuring Gerald Casale) - 3:32
 Creatures of Light and Darkness - 4:26
 Above and Below - 3:53
 Let It Burn - 4:35
 Tomorrow the World - 3:12

There is an unlisted Track 12 (which is unnamed, but shows up on the Internet as Blackman-Harris FFT 1K-10K Linear). 
When rendered using a spectrogram, provides a URL and login credentials for a "Secret Content" website where three additional songs can be downloaded in 320 kbit/s MP3 format:
"Praying To The Aliens" [4:09]
"Dancing With Strangers (Kurt's DoomVox Mix)" [4:35]
"Fly Like an Eagle" [3:37]

Personnel
 Kurt Harland
 Paul Robb
 James Cassidy
 Gerald Casale (vocals on "Beautiful World")

References

External links
 Bandcamp store
 Official Site
 Listing on Discogs

Information Society (band) albums
2014 albums